The National Coalition of Abortion Providers (NCAP) was a trade association created to represent independent abortion providers in the United States. Founded in 1990, it was based in Washington, D.C.

Leadership
From its inception in 1990 until early 2004, NCAP was led by its founding executive director, Ronald J. Fitzsimmons. After Fitzsimmons' departure, NCAP was led by President Jane Bovard (2004–2005), executive director Steven Emmert (2005–2007), and then by interim executive director Diana Philip. In 2008, NCAP dissolved and merged with the Abortion Conversation Project to form the Abortion Care Network.

References

External links
Abortion Care Network
Guide to the National Coalition of Abortion Providers Records, 1990-2009, Duke University

American abortion providers
Abortion-rights organizations in the United States
Organizations established in 1990
Organizations disestablished in 2008
1990 establishments in Washington, D.C.
2008 disestablishments in Washington, D.C.